Villa Tejupam de la Unión is a town and municipality in Oaxaca in south-western Mexico. The municipality covers an area of  km². 
It is part of the Teposcolula District in the center of the Mixteca Region

As of 2020, the municipality had a total population of 2,419.

References

Municipalities of Oaxaca